The FINA Athletes of the Year is a set of awards presented by FINA (International Swimming Federation) and the FINA Aquatics World Magazine. Each recognises excellence in five categories of aquatic sports:  swimming, diving, synchronized swimming, water polo and open water swimming.  The award was inaugurated in 2010.

Swimming

Best swimming performance

Water polo

Diving

High diving

Artistic swimming

Open water swimming

See also
 List of Swimming World Swimmers of the Year
 International Swimming Hall of Fame

External links
FINA Elects the Best in 2010 from Fédération Internationale de Natation (FINA); retrieved 2011-12-10.
FINA selected this year's best in the five disciplines (2011) from Fédération Internationale de Natation (FINA); retrieved 2011-12-10.
PR 1 - ATHLETES OF THE YEAR 2012 from Fédération Internationale de Natation (FINA); retrieved 2013-01-04.
ATHLETES OF THE YEAR 2013 from Fédération Internationale de Natation (FINA); retrieved 2014-01-06.

FINA
FINA